Bobrof Island is one of the Andreanof Islands subgroup of the Aleutian Islands in southwestern Alaska, United States. The volcanic crater, or cone, has been heavily dissected. Underwater deposits adjacent to the island's northeast flank suggest an immense debris-avalanche has taken place.

Bobrof Volcano 
Bobrof Volcano is an inactive stratovolcano which forms the small Bobrof Island. No recorded eruptions have taken place at Bobrof or in its vicinity. It has been considered as Holocene age.

Geography and geology 
Because of the inclusion of Alaska, the United States has the largest number of active volcanoes in the world, many of them geologically young. In Alaska, at least 50 volcanoes, including those in the Aleutian archipelago, have erupted in historical time. Alaska accounts for about 80% of the United States' volcanoes, excluding the seamounts in the area, about 8% of the world's volcanoes, and most of these are located among the Aleutian Islands. The Aleutian Islands arc forms the northern boundary of the Pacific Ring of Fire, where tectonic activity generates earthquakes and volcanic eruptions regularly.

The volcano is thought to be of Holocene age. Though no historical eruptions have taken place at Bobrof, it has erupted at least once. This data can be confirmed through pyroclastic flow deposits containing andesite. Once these flows were studied, at a building intended for earthquake monitoring, they confirmed that Bobrof was prone to explosive activity. There are lava deposits on the mountain which also suggest activity similar to shield eruptions. In collected samples, there are traces of basaltic andesite and dacite. No complete publications exist for Bobrof's definite geology, just those with facts and some information.

References

Further reading
|b=50|l=en|t=4001|zf=0.0|ms=sel_00dec|dw=17.701027675209602|dh=6.035539041852557|dt=gov.census.aff.domain.map.EnglishMapExtent|if=gif|cx=-170.20089635341083|cy=63.430295928031335|zl=8|pz=8|bo=318:317:316:314:313:323:319|bl=362:393:358:357:356:355:354|ft=350:349:335:389:388:332:331|fl=381:403:204:380:369:379:368|g=04000US02&-PANEL_ID=p_dt_geo_map&-_lang=en&-geo_id=100$10000US020160001001132&-CONTEXT=dt&-format=&-search_results=100$10000US020500001001047&-ds_name=DEC_2000_SF1_U Bobrof Island: Block 1132, Census Tract 1, Aleutians West Census Area, Alaska United States Census Bureau

External links
 Bobrof Island Photos Photographs from Bobrof Island, July 2008

Andreanof Islands
Volcanoes of the Aleutian Islands
Landforms of Aleutians West Census Area, Alaska
Inactive volcanoes
Volcanoes of Alaska
Uninhabited islands of Alaska
Islands of Aleutians West Census Area, Alaska
Volcanoes of Unorganized Borough, Alaska
Mountains of Unorganized Borough, Alaska
Stratovolcanoes of the United States
Islands of Alaska